Tomoka State Park is an  Florida State Park located along the Tomoka River, three miles (5 km) north of Ormond Beach on North Beach Street.

Fauna
Among the wildlife of the park are West Indian manatees, alligators, white-tailed deer, gopher tortoises, bobcats, and 160 species of birds. Seasonal birds of prey include the bald eagle, peregrine falcon, and northern harrier. The park's wading birds include egrets, herons, wood stork and American white ibis.

Historic status
Within the park is the site of the Timucuan village of Nocoroco, located on the Tomoka River. Researchers suggest that the land containing the Tomoka Mound Complex just south of the Nocoroco village site was occupied as early as 5000 B.C. It was also the location of a plantation owned by Richard Oswald, a wealthy Scottish merchant, who owned the plantation throughout the British rule of Florida. It became a state park in 1945. On May 7, 1973, it was added to the U.S. National Register of Historic Places.

Recreational activities
Activities include canoeing, boating, and fishing, as well as hiking, camping, picnicking, and wildlife viewing.

Other amenities include a one-half mile nature trail, a paved 1 mile multiuse trail, a boat ramp, five picnic areas, ample areas for fishing, and one hundred campsites.

Hours
Florida state parks are open between 8 a.m. and Midnight every day of the year (including holidays).

Gallery

References

External links

 Tomoka State Park at Florida State Parks
 Tomoka State Park at Absolutely Florida
 Tomoka State Park at Wildernet
 Volusia County listings at National Register of Historic Places
 Florida's Office of Cultural and Historical Programs
 Volusia County listings
 Volusia County markers
 Nocoroco
 Tomoka Historical Trail at Historic Hiking Trails

State parks of Florida
National Register of Historic Places in Volusia County, Florida
Museums in Volusia County, Florida
Art museums and galleries in Florida
Protected areas established in 1945
Parks in Volusia County, Florida
Ormond Beach, Florida
National Register of Historic Places in Florida
1945 establishments in Florida